Mario Ramírez Torres was a Puerto Rican shortstop in Major League Baseball. He played six seasons from  through , all coming off the bench. Known mainly for his defensive prowess, Ramírez had a career batting average of .192.

Career
He played five seasons in their minor league system, getting his first shot at the majors in April 1980. He played 18 games in two different stints in New York, going 5-for-24. He was left off the Mets' major league roster that winter, and was selected by the San Diego Padres in the Rule 5 Draft.

He later played for the Leones de Yucatán of the Mexican League during the  season.

Ramírez died in 2013 in his homeland of Yauco, Puerto Rico at the age of 55, following a long illness.

Sources

1957 births
2013 deaths
Hawaii Islanders players
Jackson Mets players
Las Vegas Stars (baseball) players
Leones de Yucatán players
Lynchburg Mets players
Major League Baseball players from Puerto Rico
Major League Baseball shortstops
Mexican League baseball infielders
New York Mets players
People from Yauco, Puerto Rico
Puerto Rican expatriate baseball players in Mexico
San Diego Padres players
Tidewater Tides players
Toledo Mud Hens players
Wausau Mets players